Naqsheh-ye Hir (also Romanized as Naqsheh-ye Ḩīr) is a village in Shalahi Rural District, in the Central District of Abadan County, Khuzestan Province, Iran. At the 2006 census, its population was 483, in 82 families.

References 

Populated places in Abadan County